Below is a complete list of presidential visits made by the president of Finland, Sauli Niinistö.

2012
  - April 17, Stockholm, official visit
  - April 25, Tallinn, official visit
  - June 20–22, Moscow, official visit
  - July 27–31, London, attend the 2012 Summer Olympics
  - September 22–29, New York, met US President Barack Obama
  - October 10–11, Oslo, official visit
  - November 8–9, Berlin, official visit

2013
  - February 11–13, Moscow, official visit
  - April 4–5, Copenhagen, official visit, met Margrethe II.
  - April 6–7, Beijing, official visit, met Xi Jinping.
  - April 16–17, Astana, official visit
  - May 28–29, Reykjavik, official visit
  - July 9–11, Paris, met Francois Hollande.
  - September 4, Stockholm, official visit
  - September 9–11, Riga, official visit
  - September 23–25, Salekhard, working visit
  - October 8–10, Warsaw, met the presidents of European states
  - October 15–16, Bern, state visit
  - December 9–11, Johannesburg, attended the state memorial service of former President Nelson Mandela

2014
  - February 6–12, Sochi, working visit, attended the Winter Olympics in Sochi
 - March 12, Beirut, official visit
  - March 23–25, Amsterdam, working visit, met Xi Jinping.
  - June 3–4, participated in events dedicated to the 25th anniversary of the fall of Comnunism in Poland met Petro Poroshenko.
  - August 15, Sochi, working visit
  - August 16, Kyiv, official visit
  - September 1, Newport, Wales, attended the Nato summit
  - September 20–25, New York, attended the UN General Assembly
  - September 25, Braga, met the presidents of European states
  - October 6–8, Frankfurt, visited the Frankfurt Book Fair
  - October 8–11, Ottawa, state visit
  - October 30-November 1, Reykjavik, working visit, attended the Arctic Circle assembly
  - November 4–5, Rome, working visit

2015
  - January 21–22, Brussels, working visit
  - February 6–8, Munich, participated in the Munich Security Conference
  - March 1, Falun, attended the 2015 World Ski Championships 
  - March 30-April 2, Warsaw, met president Bronislaw Komorowski
  - April 11–13, Abu Dhabi, official visit
  - April 21–23, Stockholm, attended a concert with the King Gustav
  - May 13–14, Aachen, working visit
  - May 23–27, Mexico City, official visit
  - June 8–9, Astana, official visit
  - October 12–15, Ankara, met President Recep Tayyip Erdogan
  - November 3, Jakarta, official visit

2016
  - February 4–5, Vienna, official visit
  - March 21–22, Moscow, meeting with the president of Russia Vladimir Putin
  - March 31-April, Washington, participated in the Nuclear Security Summit
  - May 14-14, Washington, official visit 
  - September 21, New York, delivered a speech at the UN General Assembly 
  - October 25–26, Tehran, official visit

2017

  - February 17–18, Munich, participated in the Munich Security Conference.
  - February 28, Stockholm, working visit
  - March 30, Arkhangelsk, participated in the IV International Arctic Forum, met Russian president Vladimir Putin and the president of Iceland Gudni Johannesson.
  - May 11–12, Berlin, official visit
  - August 28, Washington, met US President Donald Trump.
  - September 21–23 Minnesota, met Finnish-Americans

2018
  - February 16, Vilnius, working visit, attended the Centennial of the Restored State of Lithuania celebrations.
  - February 16–18, Munich, attended the Munich Security Conference
  - April 10, Zagreb, state visit
  - May 26, Tbilisi, attended the 100th anniversary celebrations of the Democratic Republic of Georgia, met Georgian president Giorgi Margvelashvili and Armenian president Armen Sarkissian
 - August 22, Sochi, met president Vladimir Putin
 - September 13–14, Riga, attended the Arraiolos meeting
 - September 23–28, New York City and Washington, D.C., attended the United Nations General Assembly and delivered a speech at the Brookings Institution
 - November 10–11, Paris, attended the Paris Peace Forum.
 - November 18, Riga, attended Latvian Centennial Celebration
 - December 3, Katowice, attended the United Nations Climate Change conference

2019
 - January 1, Vienna, attended Vienna Philharmonic New Year's Concert per invitation by federal president of the Republic of Austria Alexander Van der Bellen
  - January 14–15, Beijing, state visit
 - January 23, Strasbourg, attended the Parliamentary Assembly of the Council of Europe
 - February 16, Munich, attended the Munich Security Conference
 - April 9, Saint Petersburg, attended the International Arctic Forum
 - May 23–24, Ljubljana, official visit
 - July 14, Paris, attended the French National Day celebration
 - September 12–13, Kyiv, official visit
 - September 22–October 2, New York City, Washington, D.C., attended the opening week of the General Assembly of the United Nations and met US President Donald Trump
 - October 15–16, Addis Abeba, official visit
 - October 21–23, Tokyo, attended the ceremony of the enthronement of Emperor Naruhito and met Prime Minister Shinzo Abe

2020
 - January 21–24, Jerusalem, attended the World Holocaust Forum

2021 

  - August 23, Kyiv, attended the Crimea Platform
  - September 15, Rome, attended the Arraiolos Group meeting
  - October 13, Malmö, attended Malmö International Forum on Holocaust
  - October 29, Moscow, working visit, met president Vladimir Putin
  - November 21–23, Berlin, working visit

2022 

  - February 18–19, Munich, participated in the Munich Security Conference
  - March 4, Washington, met president Joe Biden
  - March 14–15, London, attended the JEF leaders' summit, met prime minister Boris Johnson
  - March 21, Paris, working visit, met president Emmanuel Macron
  - May 19, Washington, working visit together with Swedish prime minister Magdalena Andersson to meet president Joe Biden
  - June 28–30, Madrid, working visit, attended the 2022 NATO Madrid Summit.
  - October 4, Tallinn and Tapa, working visit, met president Alar Karis

2023  
 - March 16–17, Ankara, official visit

References

Niinistö
Niinistö